The 1907 Olivet football team represented Olivet College during the 1907 college football season.  In Burt Kennedy's 3rd year, Olivet compiled a 7–2 record, 5–1 in league play, and outscored their opponents by a total of 245 or 285 to 96.

Schedule

References

Olivet
Olivet Comets football seasons
Olivet football